The Netherlands women's cricket team toured Thailand in November and December 2022 to play four Women's One Day Internationals (WODIs) and four Women's Twenty20 Internationals (WT20Is). The matches were played at the Royal Chiangmai Golf Club in Mae Faek, Chiang Mai province. The WODI matches were the first played by Thailand since the International Cricket Council granted them (along with four other nations, including the Netherlands) ODI status in May 2022.

Thailand won the first game of the ODI series – their debut in the format – by 100 runs under the Duckworth-Lewis-Stern method. Thailand went on to take the series 4–0. Thailand also won the opening match of the T20I series in convincing fashion, by a margin of 10 wickets. Netherlands managed to bounce back in the second T20I by winning the match on the last ball, which was also their first ever victory over Thailand in international cricket. Thailand won the last two T20Is to take the series 3–1.

Squads

WODI series

1st WODI

2nd WODI

3rd WODI

4th WODI

WT20I series

1st WT20I

2nd WT20I

3rd WT20I

4th WT20I

Notes

References

External links
 Series home at ESPNcricinfo

2022 in Thai cricket
2022 in Dutch cricket
International cricket competitions in 2022–23
Netherlands 2022-23
Dutch cricket tours abroad